Carl Beaumier (born August 23, 1966) is a Canadian sprint canoer who competed in the late 1980s. At the 1988 Summer Olympics in Seoul, he was eliminated in the semifinals of the K-1 1000 m event.

References
Sports-Reference.com profile

External links

1966 births
Canadian male canoeists
Canoeists at the 1988 Summer Olympics
Living people
Olympic canoeists of Canada
Place of birth missing (living people)